Wingecarribee Dam, completed in 1974 as part of the Shoalhaven Scheme, is an earth and rockfill embankment dam structure located on the Wingecarribee River about  southeast of Bowral in New South Wales, Australia.

The dam has two outlets, the usual main spillway flowing into the Wingecarribee River which feeds the Warragamba Dam system, and an added extra sluice system known as the Glenquarry Cut which feeds into the Glenquarry Creek and then the Nepean River.

See also

List of reservoirs and dams in Australia

References

Dams completed in 1974
Dams in New South Wales